The two-lined blind snake (Tetracheilostoma bilineatum) is a harmless blind snake species endemic to Martinique in the Lesser Antilles.

Distribution
Though previously recorded on St. Lucia and Barbados, specimens identified to those islands were described in 2008 as separate species, L. breuili and L. carlae.  A specimen identified as from Guadeloupe was reported by Duméril and Bibron (1844:331), but none are known from that island. The type locality given is "Vaterland Martinique."

Description
It is dark brown with two yellow stripes along its sides.  It was once known as the world's smallest snake, being small enough to slither through a pencil if the lead were removed.  Its typical length is 11 cm (4.5 in). However, the newly described L. carlae (Hedges, 2008) is reported to be even smaller.

References

External links
 Leptotyphlops bilineatus at the Reptile database
 Leptotyphlops bilineatus at the Encyclopedia of Life

Tetracheilostoma
Reptiles of the Caribbean
Endemic fauna of Martinique
Reptiles described in 1839